The 2016 Cork Intermediate Hurling Championship was the 107th staging of the Cork Intermediate Hurling Championship since its establishment by the Cork County Board in 1909. The draw for the opening rounds took place on 13 December 2015. The championship began on 21 May 2016 and ended on 30 October 2016.

On 30 October 2016, Fr. O'Neill's won the championship following a 1-18 to 0-14 defeat of Kildorrery in a replay of the final. This was their second championship title in the grade and their first since 2007.

Declan Dalton was the championship's top scorer with 5-55. It remains the highest score ever recorded by a player in a single championship season.

Team changes

To Championship

Promoted from the City Junior A Hurling Championship
 Blackrock
 Douglas
 Glen Rovers
 Na Piarsaigh
 St. Finbarr's

Promoted from the East Cork Junior A Hurling Championship
 Dungourney
 Midleton

Promoted from the Mid Cork Junior A Hurling Championship
 Inniscarra

Promoted from the South East Junior A Hurling Championship
 Ballinhassig
 Ballymartle
 Carrigaline

From Championship

Promoted to the Cork Premier Intermediate Hurling Championship
 Charleville

Results

Preliminary round

Round 1

Round 2A

Round 2B

Relegation playoffs

Round 3

Round 4

Quarter-final

Semi-finals

Finals

Championship statistics

Top scorers

Overall

In a single game

References

External links
 2016 Cork IHC results

Cork Intermediate Hurling Championship
Cork Intermediate Hurling Championship